Rosefelo Siosi (born 23 August 1996) is a Solomon Islands track and field athlete. 

At the 2016 Summer Olympics he competed in the Men's 5000 m. He finished in 48th place in a personal best time after he crossed the finish line in 15:47.76.

Siosi received a huge crowd ovation at the 2022 Commonwealth Games in Birmingham on 6 August, 2022 when he completed the 5,000m race alone, 4 minutes after event winner Jacob Kiplimo who was completing his lap of honour as Siosi continued to run his race. Comparisons were drawn with Eric Moussambani, nicknamed ‘Eric the Eel’ and ski jumper Eddie the Eagle who similarly captured the hearts of spectators with endeavour rather than achievement at major competitions. Siosi’s time in Birmingham of 17:28.93 was a seasons best for him. Following the race he said he hoped his nation would soon get a synthetic running track to help his training, and now his studies have finished he is aiming to run well at the 2023 Pacific Games before aiming for the Paris Olympics in 2024.

References

External links
 

Solomon Islands male long-distance runners
1996 births
Olympic athletes of the Solomon Islands
Athletes (track and field) at the 2016 Summer Olympics
Commonwealth Games competitors for the Solomon Islands
Athletes (track and field) at the 2014 Commonwealth Games
Living people